Nertil Hoxhaj (born 21 May 1997) is an Albanian football player who plays as a left back for KF Besa Kavajë in the Kategoria e Parë.

Career

Early career
Although born in Fier, Hoxhaj began his youth career with KF Tirana as a child where he remained until 2011, which is when he moved to arch rivals Partizani Tirana to join the youth setup there. In his debut season with Partizani he was a member of the under-17 side, but was promoted to the under-19s the following year and he was also called up to the senior team by head coach Sulejman Starova to feature in an Albanian Cup fixture against Korabi Peshkopi. Hoxhaj made his professional debut in that match on 29 September 2015, coming on for fellow debutant Rigers Mersini at half time in the 2–0 loss for Partizani who fielded a mostly weakened side. Aside from the under-19s, he also played for the club's reserve side Partizani Tirana B in the Albanian Second Division, and was again called up for another Albanian Cup fixture on 21 October against KF Lushnja, where he came on as a 78th minute substitute for Jurgen Bardhi in the 3–1 win for Partizani. Hoxhaj also featured in the return leg of the tie against KF Lushnja on 2 November, coming on at half time for Jovan Nikolić in the 3–0 win. He made his professional league debut with Partizani on the final day of the season on 18 May 2016 against Teuta Durrës at the Qemal Stafa Stadium, where he played the full 90 minutes in the 2–1 loss for his side.

Career statistics

References

1997 births
Living people
Sportspeople from Fier
Albanian footballers
Association football defenders
KF Tirana players
FK Partizani Tirana players
Flamurtari Vlorë players
KF Bylis Ballsh players
KF Elbasani players
KF Vushtrria players
KF Llapi players
KF Vllaznia Shkodër players
KF Besa Kavajë players
Kategoria Superiore players
Kategoria e Dytë players
Football Superleague of Kosovo players
Albanian expatriate footballers
Expatriate footballers in Kosovo
Albanian expatriate sportspeople in Kosovo